Poa unilateralis is a species of grass known by the common names San Francisco bluegrass, ocean-bluff bluegrass, and sea-bluff bluegrass.

Distribution
It is native to west coast of the United States from Washington to central California, where it grows in coastal habitats such as bluffs and beaches in sandy saline soils.

Description
It is a perennial grass forming dense clumps of stems up to 40 centimeters tall. The herbage may be waxy in texture. The leaves may be thin and early-withering or somewhat fleshy and persistent. The inflorescence is a dense cluster of short branches bearing small, hairy-edged spikelets.

External links
Jepson Manual Treatment
USDA Plants Profile
Grass Manual Treatment
Photo gallery

unilateralis
Native grasses of California
Flora of Oregon
Flora of Washington (state)
Flora without expected TNC conservation status